Paul White may refer to:
Paul Dudley White (1886–1973), American cardiologist
Paul Frederick White (born before 1970), American anesthesiologist
Paul White (journalist) (1902–1955), American journalist, news director of CBS during WWII
Paul White (missionary) (1910–1992), Australian missionary, evangelist, radio program host and author, the "Jungle Doctor"
Paul White (American football) (1921–1974), American football player
Paul White, Baron Hanningfield (born 1940), British life peer
Paul White (rugby league) (born 1982), Jamaican rugby league player
Paul White (record producer) (active from 2007), British electro and hiphop producer and musician 
Paul White (bishop) (born 1949), bishop in the Anglican Diocese of Melbourne
Paul White (Australian footballer) (1893–1973), Australian rules footballer
Paul White (racing driver) (born 1963), American racing driver
W. Paul White (born 1945), American politician in Massachusetts
Paul White, drummer for British metal band The Defiled (active from 2005)

See also
Paul Wight, professional wrestler, known by his ring names "The Big Show" and "The Giant"